Downtown is an album by Petula Clark (her first album licensed to Warner Bros. Records) following the success of her single of the same title. The album's tracks were all produced, arranged and conducted by Tony Hatch and were recorded at the Pye Studios in Marble Arch with the session personnel including drummer Bobby Graham, guitarist Big Jim Sullivan and the Breakaways vocal group; the "Downtown" track included guitarists Vic Flick and Jimmy Page in addition to Sullivan.
Most of the album's tracks pre-dated the title cut, with almost all of the sides Hatch had produced from their inaugural collaboration: the 1963 single "Let Me Tell You Baby", being included.

Downtown entered the Billboard 200 on 13 February 1965 for a 36 weeks chart run with a #21 peak. Despite Clark's subsequent album releases being more focused on the hit sound Hatch had devised for Clark with the "Downtown" single, the Downtown album would remain Clark's most successful US album release. Downtown did not rank in the UK album charts which were then limited to the Top Twenty.
1 A collection of standards entitled This is Petula Clark! had been released on the Imperial label in 1959 and was reissued as Uptown with Petula Clark after she achieved fame in the States.

References

External links
http://www.petulaclark.net/discography.html official discography

1965 albums
Petula Clark albums
Pye Records albums
Disques Vogue albums
Warner Records albums
Albums conducted by Tony Hatch
Albums arranged by Tony Hatch
Albums produced by Tony Hatch